New Hampshire Route 135 (abbreviated NH 135) is a  north–south state highway in New Hampshire. The highway runs along the Connecticut River from Woodsville in the town of Haverhill to Lancaster.

The southern terminus of NH 135 is at New Hampshire Route 10 in Woodsville. The northern terminus is at U.S. Route 2 and U.S. Route 3 in Lancaster.

Major intersections

References

External links

 New Hampshire State Route 135 on Flickr

135
Transportation in Grafton County, New Hampshire
Transportation in Coös County, New Hampshire